Juan Manuel Trujillo (1907–1976) was a Spanish essayist and publisher.

Spanish essayists
Spanish male writers
People from Santa Cruz de Tenerife
1907 births
1976 deaths
Male essayists
20th-century essayists